Andricus crystallinus, also known as the crystalline gall wasp, is a species of gall-forming wasp in the genus Andricus. Its galls are pink and covered in hairs that are white, red, or brown. These galls are often massed together in clumps that can cover the underside of leaves. Individual galls are 12-14 mm high, 7 mm across, and have a single chamber for larvae. The unisexual female generation emerges in late winter, and the bisexual generation of males and females emerges in March. They are found in all species of oaks in California.

References

External links
 Andricus crystallinus on gallformers

Cynipidae
Gall-inducing insects
Oak galls